Daniel Fraser may refer to:

Daniel Fraser (actor), British actor
Daniel R. Fraser (1851–1920), politician from Edmonton, Alberta, Canada
Daniel Fraser (engineer) (1787–1849), Scottish-born engineer in Sweden
Daniel Fraser (rugby) (fl. 1902–1909), New Zealand rugby league international
Dan Fraser (born 1963), Canadian media executive

See also
Dan Frasier, American football coach
Dan Frazier (rugby union) (born 1988), English rugby union player
Dan Frazier (artist), (born 1945), American artist
Daniel Frazier (c. 1785–1833), U.S. sailor
Paul Frazier (1967–2018), American football player born Daniel Frazier